Ballet Romand is a dance company located in Vevey, Switzerland. It was founded in 2005 as a non-profit association.  The company was founded by American born dancer, Kim White.

Founder 

Ballet Romand founder, Kim White began her dance studies at an early age under her mother, Nan Klinger.  She continued her studies at the School of American Ballet, home of the New York City Ballet.  She holds a diploma from the National Academy of Arts.  She was the first representative of the United States to compete in the Prix de Lausanne.  Her professional career as a principal dancer expanded across America.  She started teaching in 1979 while dancing professionally and has taught in renowned schools in New York such as Steps, Broadway Dance Center and the National Dance Institute where she continues to give summer instruction.  In 1989, Kim founded the Los Angeles Youth Ballet.  She continues to work with youth companies in America and England.  In 2004, Kim was a recipient of a Swiss Award, the Prix de L’Eveil, recognizing her commitment and work with young people in dance.

Consultants 

 Anna du Boisson—West London School of Dance (London, UK)
 Maria Welch—Cuyahoga Valley Youth Ballet (Akron, Ohio, USA)
 Lori Klinger—Rosie’s Broadway Kids (New York, New York, USA)
 Darren Parish—Royal Academy of Ballet, Danceworks (London, UK)
 Céline Chazot—Ex Béjart Ballet
 Pam Pribisco—NYC choreographer
 Pasquale Alberico—Ex Béjart Ballet

References

External links
 Dance For You Magazine Article
 

Dance schools in Switzerland
Ballet companies in Switzerland
Performing groups established in 2005
Vevey
2005 establishments in Switzerland